was a Japanese animation studio producing anime using cel shading and 3D computer graphics technology.

History
The company was founded in Minato, Tokyo by the screenwriter Ishidate Uraaka in August 2013.

The company won the third edition of the  award on December 28, 2017.

On April 1, 2020, it was announced that Yaoyorozu had been dissolved and folded into a new company called 8million, a move meant to consolidate company assets under a single name; little would change in the company's day-to-day business.

Works

Television series

References

External links

  
 

 
Defunct mass media companies of Japan
Animation studios in Tokyo
Japanese animation studios
Japanese companies disestablished in 2020
Japanese companies established in 2013
Mass media companies established in 2013
Mass media companies disestablished in 2020